Ornativalva alces is a moth of the family Gelechiidae. It was described by Oleksiy V. Bidzilya in 2009. It is found in Uzbekistan.

References

Moths described in 2009
Ornativalva